SENTRAL College Penang is a private college situated in George Town, Penang. The campus is located at Lebuh Penang, and it is the tallest building in the core zone of UNESCO World Heritage Site. Previously, it was known as Sentral Technology College until the end of 2013. Its courses cover Business, Accounting and Finance, Computing, Tourism, and Early Childhood Education. The college also offers programmes affiliated to UNITAR and the University of Salford.

History
Sentral Technology College was first established as an Institute for tertiary education on 1 January 2002. In 2006, the Ministry of Education Malaysia upgraded the status of SENTRAL to that of a College. SENTRAL College Penang, with the ideals that inspired its founders, continues its commitment to the pursuit of education excellence within the context of respect, caring, and justice, marked by The National Ideology and intellectual vigour as in the National Education Philosophy.
In December 2013, Sentral Technology College changed its name to SENTRAL College Penang and expanded its operation in new building located at Lebuh Penang.

Location
The college is located at intersection between Lebuh Penang and Lebuh Bishop. It is the tallest building in the core zone of UNESCO World Heritage Site.

Campus life

Clubs and societies
 Student Ambassador (SA)
 Student Representative Council (SRC)
 United Chinese Student Associations (UCSA)
 Persatuan Mahasiswa Islam Club (PERMAI)
 Computing and IT Club
 Indian Cultural Society (ICS)
 Entrepreneurship Club
 Integrity Club
 Rotaract Club
 The Accountancy Club (TAC)
 Arts and Cultural Club
 Chil Deb'ut Club (Early Childhood Education)

References

Private universities and colleges in Malaysia
Educational institutions established in 2002
2002 establishments in Malaysia